Juan Manuel Santisteban Lapeire (25 October 1944 – 21 May 1976) was a Spanish road cyclist.

During the first stage of the 1976 Giro d'Italia, Santisteban crashed and hit his head, ultimately dying from his injuries.

He rode in five editions of the Vuelta a España, winning two stages.

Major results

1970
 3rd Overall Vuelta a La Rioja
 10th Overall Vuelta a España
1971
 1st Stage 3 Vuelta a Levante
 1st Stage 5 Vuelta a Asturias
 1st Stage 3 Vuelta a Cantabria
1972
 1st Stage 5 Volta a Catalunya
1973
 1st Stage 9 Vuelta a España
1974
 1st  Overall Vuelta a Asturias
1st Stages 2b (TTT) & 4
 1st Stage 15 Vuelta a España
 1st Stage 2 Vuelta a Aragón
 1st Stage 6 Critérium du Dauphiné Libéré
 1st Stage 4 Vuelta a los Valles Mineros
 1st  Overall Tres Días de Leganés
 2nd Overall Vuelta a La Rioja
 2nd Overall Vuelta a Segovia
1976
 1st Stage 7 Vuelta a Andalucía

References

1944 births
1976 deaths
Spanish male cyclists
People from Asón-Agüera
Cyclists from Cantabria
Cyclists who died while racing
Spanish Vuelta a España stage winners
Sport deaths in Italy